Rixt van der Horst (born 26 January 1992) is a Dutch Paralympic equestrian athlete. She won a bronze medal at the 2020 Summer Paralympics in Tokyo with her horse Findsley.

References

External links
 

1992 births
Living people
Paralympic equestrians of the Netherlands
Paralympic silver medalists for the Netherlands
Paralympic bronze medalists for the Netherlands
Paralympic medalists in equestrian
Equestrians at the 2016 Summer Paralympics
Equestrians at the 2020 Summer Paralympics
Medalists at the 2016 Summer Paralympics
Medalists at the 2020 Summer Paralympics
20th-century Dutch people
21st-century Dutch people